Argheshabad (also Romanized as Argheshābād; also known as Ebrāhīmābād) is a village in Bibi Sakineh Rural District, in the Central District of Malard County, Tehran Province, Iran. At the 2006 census, its population was 559, in 147 families.

References 

Populated places in Malard County